Aleksandr Aleksandrovich Dimidko (born 20 January 1986) is a Russian football coach and a former player. He is an assistant coach with FC Rodina Moscow. He played as a centre-back.

Club career

Career statistics

Notes

References

1986 births
Sportspeople from Khabarovsk
Living people
FC Dynamo Moscow players
Russian footballers
Association football defenders
Russian Premier League players
FC SKA-Khabarovsk players
FC Tom Tomsk players
FC Mordovia Saransk players
FC Arsenal Tula players
FC Khimki players
FC Dynamo Bryansk players
FC Ararat Moscow players